Flamingo lily is a common name for several species of Anthurium with large red spathes.

Flamingo lily may refer to:

Anthurium andraeanum
Anthurium scherzerianum